General Gilbert may refer to:

Charles Champion Gilbert (1822–1903), Union Army brigadier general and acting major general
Glyn Gilbert (1920–2003), British Army major general
James Isham Gilbert (1823–1884), Union Army brigadier general and brevet major general
S. Taco Gilbert III (born 1956), U.S. Air Force brigadier general
Sir Walter Gilbert, 1st Baronet (1785–1853), British East India Company general

See also
Attorney General Gilbert (disambiguation)